Sunil Kumar Singh is an Indian politician business person and social worker. He is serving as a Member of Bihar Legislative Assembly from Bhore Vidhansabha. He is member of Janata Dal (United), political party. Sunil won Bihar Assembly Elections 2020 from Bhore Vidhansabha (Scheduled Caste) comes under Gopalganj district of Bihar State.

References 

Year of birth missing (living people)
Living people